Li Miao (died 234), courtesy name Hannan, was an official of the state of Shu Han during the Three Kingdoms period of China. He previously served under the warlord Liu Zhang and later Liu Bei in the late Eastern Han dynasty.

Life
Li Miao was from Qi County (郪縣), Guanghan Commandery (廣漢郡), which is in present-day Santai County, Sichuan. He initially served as the Chief of Niubei County (牛鞞縣; present-day Jianyang, Sichuan) under Liu Zhang, the Governor of Yi Province (covering present-day Sichuan and Chongqing).

In 214, after the warlord Liu Bei seized control of Yi Province from Liu Zhang and became the new Governor, he appointed Li Miao as an assistant officer (從事) in his office. In the following year, on the first day of the lunar new year, when Li Miao came to greet Liu Bei, he used the opportunity to tell Liu Bei:  Liu Bei then asked him: "Since you believe it is improper of me to do so, then why don't you help (Liu Zhang)?" Li Miao replied: "It's not because I don't want to help him. It's because I don't have the ability to." When Liu Bei's subordinates urged their lord to execute Li Miao for his audacity, Zhuge Liang stepped in and managed to convince Liu Bei to spare Li Miao.

After the fall of the Eastern Han dynasty in 220, Li Miao went on to serve in the state Shu, founded by Liu Bei in 221, during the Three Kingdoms period. He consecutively held the positions of Administrator of Qianwei (犍為太守), Army Adviser under the Imperial Chancellor (丞相參軍), and General Who Pacifies Han (安漢將軍).

In 228, after Zhuge Liang executed Ma Su for his failure at the Battle of Jieting, Li Miao told Zhuge Liang:  As a result, Li Miao fell out of Zhuge Liang's favour and was sent back from the frontline to the Shu capital Chengdu.

After Zhuge Liang died in 234, the Shu emperor Liu Shan declared a three-day mourning period. During this time, Li Miao wrote a memorial to Liu Shan as follows:  Liu Shan turned furious after reading Li Miao's memorial and ordered his execution.

Family
Li Miao had three brothers: Li Chao (李朝), Li Shao (李邵), and an unnamed younger brother.

Li Chao (李朝), whose courtesy name was Weinan (偉南), started his career as an Officer of Merit (功曹) in his native Guanghan Commandery before he was nominated as a xiaolian (civil service candidate) for higher positions. He later served as the Prefect of Linqiong County (臨邛縣; present-day Qionglai, Sichuan) and as an aide-de-camp under Liu Bei. In 219, when Liu Bei declared himself "King of Hanzhong" following his victory in the Hanzhong Campaign, Li Chao was the one who wrote the declaration for him. Li Chao participated in the Battle of Xiaoting against Wu and died in 222 in Yong'an (永安; present-day Fengjie County, Chongqing) after the battle.

Li Shao (李邵), whose courtesy name was Yongnan (永南), served as a scribe and assistant officer under Liu Bei after the latter seized control of Yi Province from Liu Zhang in 214. During the Jianxing era (223–237) of Liu Shan's reign, Li Shao became an assistant official under Zhuge Liang. In 225, when Zhuge Liang went on his southern campaign in the Nanzhong region, he left Li Shao behind in Chengdu to serve as an assistant officer in the headquarters office (治中從事). Li Shao died in the same year.

Li Miao had an unnamed younger brother who was as famous as his brothers for his talent. However, he died at a relatively young age. Li Miao's three brothers were collectively nicknamed the "Three Dragons of the Li Family" (李氏三龍). Li Miao himself, however, was not considered one of the "Dragons of the Li Family" because of his offensive and rude behaviour.

See also
 Lists of people of the Three Kingdoms

Notes

References

 Chen, Shou (3rd century). Records of the Three Kingdoms (Sanguozhi).
 
 Pei, Songzhi (5th century). Annotations to Records of the Three Kingdoms (Sanguozhi zhu).
 

Year of birth unknown
234 deaths
Shu Han politicians
Executed Shu Han people
Politicians from Mianyang
People executed by Shu Han
Executed people from Sichuan